This is a list of episodes of the 2009 television series The Electric Company.

Series Overview

Season 1 (2009)

Season 2 (2010)

Season 3 (2011)

Season 4 (2012)
This season includes past episodes that were edited with new content, and new Prankster Planet segments.

Notes

External links
Season one episode descriptions at Sesame Workshop
Season two episode descriptions at Sesame Workshop
Season three episode descriptions at Sesame Workshop

Electric Company (2009 series)